Streetsounds may refer to:

 Streetsounds (radio show), a defunct radio show on Radio Clyde
 StreetSounds (record label), a 1980s UK record label specialising in dance music